Chornye Zemli Nature Reserve (also) is a Russian 'zapovednik' (strict nature reserve). The name in Russian means "Black Lands".  The main part of the reserve is located in the Caspian Depression, northwest of the Caspian Sea.  It was originally created in 1990 to protect the saiga antelope (Saiga tatarica). In the meantime the economy of Kalmykia collapsed and the numbers of saiga have crashed due to poaching for meat and horns (Chinese medicine) and desertification caused by overgrazing by domestic animals. The reserve also has colonies of egrets, cormorants, and rare pelicans.   The reserve is situated in the Chernozemelsky District of Republic of Kalmykia.  It was created in 1990, and covers 1,219 km² in two locations, with a 900 km² buffer zone.

Since 1993 to 2021, Cherny Zemli Nature Reserve was designated as one of UNESCO biosphere reserves.

Ecoregion and climate
Chornye Zemli is located in the middle of the Caspian lowland desert ecoregion, a region that covers the north and southeast coasts of the Caspian Sea, including the deltas of the Volga River and Ural River in the northern region.  Although precipitation is relatively low (less than 200 mm/year), wildlife is supported by the river systems and sea itself.

The climate of Chornye Zemli is cool semi-arid (Köppen climate classification BSk). This climate is characterized by high variation in temperature, both daily and seasonally; with low precipitation.

See also    
 List of Russian Nature Reserves (class 1a 'zapovedniks')
 National parks of Russia
 Protected areas of Russia

References

 Center for Russian Nature Conservation, Cherny Zemly Zapovednik
 Chernye Zemli Nature Reserve

External links
  Map of Chyornye Zemli Reserve, OpenStreetMap

Nature reserves in Russia
Geography of Kalmykia
Protected areas established in 1990
1990 establishments in Russia
Zapovednik